This is a list of flags used in Northern Ireland.

Official flags

Current
These are the flags used by the British Government, the Northern Ireland Assembly and the Monarch in Northern Ireland.

Former

Local government flags

Current

Former

University flags

Others

GAA colours
GAA county colours are used to represent Irish counties in the Gaelic Athletic Association's inter-county competitions, most notably the All-Ireland Senior Football Championship in Gaelic football and the All-Ireland Senior Hurling Championship in Hurling.

Timeline

See also

 Flag of Northern Ireland
 Northern Ireland flags issue
 List of flags of Ireland
 Cross-border flag for Ireland
 Coat of arms of Northern Ireland

References

Northern Ireland
 
Flags